City Hall was a historic city hall building located at Muncie, Delaware County, Indiana. It was built in 1925, and was a three-story, "L"-shaped, Renaissance Revival style brick building with terra cotta detailing. It has been demolished.

It was added to the National Register of Historic Places in 1988.

References

City and town halls on the National Register of Historic Places in Indiana
Renaissance Revival architecture in Indiana
Government buildings completed in 1925
Buildings and structures in Muncie, Indiana
National Register of Historic Places in Muncie, Indiana